Meenampatti is a village in Virudhunagar district of the Indian state of Tamil Nadu. It is 3 kilometers away from Sivakasi.

Notable persons 

 Sridevi

Reference 

Villages in Virudhunagar district